The Cyber Threat Intelligence Integration Center (CTIIC) is a new United States federal government agency that will be a fusion center between existing agencies and the private sector for real-time use against cyber attacks. CTIIC was created due to blocked efforts in Congress that were stymied over liability and privacy concerns of citizens.

CTIIC was formally announced by Lisa Monaco February 10, 2015 at the Wilson Center. The agency will be within the Office of the Director of National Intelligence.

List of directors of the Cyber Threat Intelligence Integration Center

Tonya Ugoretz (January 7, 2016 - March 13, 2019)
Erin Joe (March 13, 2019 – present)

See also
 Cyber Intelligence Sharing and Protection Act
 Cyber threat intelligence
 Department of Homeland Security
 Intelligence Reform and Terrorism Prevention Act

References

Federal government of the United States
Computer security
Internet law in the United States
2015 establishments in the United States
Counterterrorism in the United States
Government agencies established in 2015